Lance Percival (14 August 1906 – 1 September 1964) was a British hurdler. He competed in the men's 400 metres hurdles at the 1928 Summer Olympics.

References

1906 births
1964 deaths
Athletes (track and field) at the 1928 Summer Olympics
British male hurdlers
Olympic athletes of Great Britain
People from Fulham
Athletes from London